Ben Doller (previously Doyle) (born 1973 Warsaw, New York) is an American poet and writer.

Life
Ben Doller is the author of several books of poetry. He currently teaches at University of California, San Diego.

He graduated from the State University of New York at Oswego, and West Virginia University.

He received his MFA from the Iowa Writers' Workshop, where he was awarded a Teaching-Writing Fellowship.

Doller has taught at the Iowa Writers' Workshop, West Virginia University, Denison University, Antioch University, and in 2007, was distinguished visiting professor at Boise State University.

He was formerly a co-editor of the Kuhl House Contemporary Poetry Series at the University of Iowa Press (until 2010), and vice-editor and designer of 1913 a journal of forms, and 1913 Press.  He read at AWP 2009.

He lives in San Diego with his partner & collaborator, the poet & writer Sandra Doller (formerly Miller). In 2007, the two merged their last names: Doyle + Miller = Doller.

Awards
 2000 Walt Whitman Award.

Works
 "taxes"; "Oust Manacle"; "Same Problem", Coconut 10, October 2007 
 "big deference betwixt throwing things and throwing things away"; "A POINTING HABIT"; "NICETIES"; "CHICKENSTRIPS", La Petite Zine
 
 Added to The &NOW Awards 2: The Best Innovative Writing.  &NOW Books, 2013.

Poetry books
 
 
  2010.  
 Fauxhawk, Wesleyan University Press (2015).

Anthology

References

External links
 Ben Doller & Sandra Doller rabbit light movies
 Ben Doller's FAQ, Ahsahta Press
 Ben Doller, Academy of American Poets
 Ben Doyle & Sandra Miller wedding in NY Times

1973 births
Living people
American male poets
State University of New York at Oswego alumni
West Virginia University alumni
Iowa Writers' Workshop alumni
Iowa Writers' Workshop faculty
West Virginia University faculty
Denison University faculty
Boise State University faculty
People from Warsaw, New York
21st-century American poets
21st-century American male writers